The  is a limited express train service in Japan operated by JR Shikoku which runs from  to  and .

The Muroto service was introduced on 13 March 1999.

Route
The stations served by this service are as follows:

 -  -  -  -  -  -  -  -  -  -  - - -

Between Mugi and Awa-Kainan, the train runs as a local service.

Rolling stock
KiHa 185 series 2- car DMUs (from 1999)

History
From 5 March 1966, however, the name was used for express trains operating. From 13 March 1999, the name was used for limited express trains operating between Tokushima and Kaifu.

References

JR Timetable, August 2008 issue
"ＪＲ新幹線＆特急列車ファイル" (JR Shinkansen & Limited Express Train File), published 2008 by Kōtsū Shimbun

External links

JR Shikoku Train Information 

Named passenger trains of Japan
Shikoku Railway Company
Railway services introduced in 1962